Karen Aletha Maybank is an American physician, with family roots in Antigua. She is board certified in both pediatrics and preventive medicine/public health. Currently, Dr. Maybank is the Chief Health Equity Officer and Vice President of the American Medical Association.

Early life and education 
Maybank was born in Harrisburg, Pennsylvania. She holds a Bachelor of Arts from Johns Hopkins University, a Medical Degree from Temple University School of Medicine, and a Master of Public Health from Columbia University Mailman School of Public Health.

Career
Dr. Maybank is a founding board member of the Artemis Medical Society, an international mentoring, networking, and advocacy organization of over 2,500 Black female physicians established in June 2012.

Later in 2012, she co-founded "We Are Doc McStuffins," along with two other founding members of the Artemis Medical Society, Dr. Myiesha Taylor, Dr. Naeemah Ghafur, who were inspired by the Disney Junior character Doc McStuffins. This initiative, in celebration of Black History Month, featured several shorts of Doc along with Dr. Taylor, Dr. Ghafur, and Dr. Maybank sharing what their jobs as physicians were like and who they look up to.

Her areas of expertise include preventive medicine, food and fitness, maternal and child health, cancer, HIV/AIDS, community health, and health inequities.

Maybank served on two medical mission trips to Haïti in 2010. She assisted with the post-earthquake relief efforts and provided direct health care to child survivors.

Maybank created the blog, "On Call in the City", in an effort to make health an accessible topic "wherever one lives, works, plays, and prays”. She has a bi-weekly column, Doctor's Orders, on the website of EBONY magazine. The column was established for Maybank to share her health expertise with the African American community-at-large. She is also a contributor for Huffington Post.

She has been honored by the National Coalition of 100 Black Men, the Hip Hop Loves Foundation, and others (see Awards).

Maybank was a guest speaker at Kechie's Project and Bread & Roses High School Fashion Showcase in Harlem, NY on June 18 2013. She spoke on a panel at the ESSENCE Festival Empowerment Experience Panels titled I Beat: Healthy, Journeys & Transformations on July 5th 2013. The topic was that maintaining healthy lifestyles require work and the panel experts shared tips on how to achieve overall fitness and diet goals. 

Maybank was appointed the Associate Commissioner of the Center for Health Equity with New York City Department of Health and Mental Hygiene in 2014. She is the founding director of the department's Center of Health Equity.

In April 2019, she joined the American Medical Association (AMA) as their inaugural Chief Health Equity Officer and Vice President. In that role she co-authored and edited the AMA’s guidance document Advancing Health Equity: A Guide to Language, Narrative, and Concepts, which asked “questions about language and commonly used phrases and terms, with the goal of cultivating awareness about dominant narratives and offering equity-based, equity-explicit, and person-first alternatives.”

Awards 
2012 The Network Journal 40 Under Forty Award
2012 Women of Excellence Award; Diaspora Services
2012 Beauty and the Beat: Heroine in Excellence Award
2011 Outstanding NYC Leader Award, Kechie's Project
2011 NV Magazine's Movers & Shakers

Television 
Maybank is a weekly television contributor on ARISE America, a program on the Arise News channel.

She has appeared or been profiled on MSNBC's Melissa Harris-Perry show, BET's 106 & Park, HuffPost Live, Our World with Black Enterprise, FOX 5 NY Good Day Street Talk, and various other outlets.

Film

Print 
'Meet Dr. Aletha Maybank, Champion of Public Health', Jet Magazine, June 27, 2013
'A Physician on a Mission', Amsterdam News, May 23, 2013

References

American pediatricians
Women pediatricians
Living people
1974 births
People from Harrisburg, Pennsylvania
Johns Hopkins University alumni
Temple University alumni
Columbia University Mailman School of Public Health alumni